Zotovskaya is a rural locality (a stanitsa) in Arzhanovskoye Rural Settlement, Alexeyevsky District, Volgograd Oblast, Russia. The population was 76 as of 2010.

Geography 
Zotovskaya is located on the right bank of the Khopyor River, 41 km southeast of Alexeyevskaya (the district's administrative centre) by road. Sidorovka is the nearest rural locality.

References 

Rural localities in Alexeyevsky District, Volgograd Oblast